Jaren Sina (born March 12, 1994) is an Kosovan-American professional basketball player, who lastly played for Astoria Bydgoszcz of the Polish Basketball League. He played college basketball for the Seton Hall Pirates and George Washington Colonials.

Personal
Born in Figueira da Foz, Portugal to Kosovo-Albanians parents Jill and Mergin Sina, who originate from Dibër, Albania, he was raised in the Lake Hopatcong section of Jefferson Township, New Jersey, USA. Mergin played basketball professionally in Belgium, Spain, Italy, Argentina and Portugal. In Portugal, he was inducted into the Hall of Fame and holds the country's single-game scoring record, with 69 points in a single game. Sina's sister Jasmine is a member of the St. John's Red Storm women's basketball team.

High school career
Sina was three-time All-State guard who scored 2,146 points, breaking Jeffrey Dangelmajer's all-time scoring record, and handed out 861 assists at Gill St. Bernard's School. Also was four-star recruit who ranked in the top-100 nationally in the 2013 class by ESPN.com. He was three-time Somerset County Player of the Year who helped transform Gill St. Bernard's into a national power. The Knights broke into the USA Today High School top 25, rising as high as No. 15 in 2012. Also played for his father, Mergin Sina, who was a two-year letterwinner at Seton Hall (1984–86). He finished as the all-time leading scorer and assist leader in Somerset County history, and was second in three-pointers. As a senior, he led Gill St. Bernard's averaging 21.3 points, 9.1 assists and tallying 117 threes.

College career
In his freshman season he was Big East Conference All-Rookie Team selection, also earned Big East Conference Academic All-Star recognition. Sina was one of two players to appear in all 34 games, earning 19 starts. He started eight of the final nine games, including all three Big East Conference Tournament contests. He averaged 6.0 points, 2.4 assists and 1.4 rebounds, and led the team in assists seven times and had three 5-plus-assist games. He ranked 10th in the conference shooting 38.2% (39–102) from three-point range in Big East games. He also made starts in nine of 18 Big East appearances and averaged 2.7 assists (2.4 assist-to-turnover ratio) in conference starts.

In 2015, Sina decided to transfer from Seton Hall due to what he called "an untenable locker-room situation." He had averaged 7.0 points per game. He transferred to George Washington, and after sitting out a season due to NCAA transfer rules, he started 34 of GW's 35 games at point guard, averaging 9 points and 3.3 assists per game. He graduated from George Washington in 2016 and rather than return for a graduate year, he signed with an agent to play professionally in Europe, which also made him automatically eligible for the 2017 NBA draft due to him leaving as a redshirt junior.

Professional career
After going undrafted, Sina joined AVIS Utilitas Rapla of the Estonian Korvpalli Meistriliiga (KML). Sina departed Rapla, and later went to France to join Pro B side ADA Blois Basket 41 as a free agent. With Blois, he won the Pro B championship and gained promotion to the French top-tier Pro A. On October 3, 2018, Sina signed with Austrian club Flyers Wels.

References

External links
George Washington bio

1994 births
Living people
ADA Blois Basket 41 players
American expatriate basketball people in Austria
American expatriate basketball people in Estonia
American expatriate basketball people in France
American men's basketball players
American people of Albanian descent
American people of Kosovan descent
Astoria Bydgoszcz players
Basketball players from New Jersey
Flyers Wels players
George Washington Colonials men's basketball players
Gill St. Bernard's School alumni
Korvpalli Meistriliiga players
Kosovan men's basketball players
People from Figueira da Foz
People from Jefferson Township, New Jersey
Point guards
Rapla KK players
Seton Hall Pirates men's basketball players
Sportspeople from Morris County, New Jersey